Sanmen, may refer to:

 Sanmen County, a county in Taizhou, Zhejiang, China.
 Sanmen, Longsheng County, a town in Longsheng Various Nationalities Autonomous County, Guangxi, China.